Salins-les-Bains, commonly referred to simply as Salins, is a commune in the Jura department in the Bourgogne-Franche-Comté region in Eastern France. It is located on the departmental border with Doubs, 34.8 km (21.6 mi) to the south-southwest of Besançon. In 2018, Salins-les-Bains had a population of 2,567.

The town owes its name to its saline waters which shaped its history for centuries; they continue to attract visitors today, for the town's bedrock contains salt and gypsum deposits. In 2009 the historic saltworks were added to the list of UNESCO World Heritage Sites as an addition to the Royal Saltworks at Arc-et-Senans site, which was inscribed in 1982.

Geography
Salins is situated in the narrow Valley of the Furieuse, between two fortified hills, Fort Belin and Fort Saint-André, while to the north rises Mont Poupet (851 m or 2,791 ft).

History
Salins was an important city in Celtic times and was an oppidum of Ancient Rome.
The territory of Salins, which was enfeoffed in the 10th century by the Abbey of Saint Maurice-en-Valais to the counts of Mâcon, remained in possession of their descendants till 1175. Maurette de Salins, heiress of this dynasty, brought the lordship to the house of Vienne, and her granddaughter sold it in 1225 to Hugh IV of Burgundy, who ceded it in 1237 to John of Chalon in exchange for the county of Chalon. John's descendants, counts, and dukes of Burgundy, emperors and kings of the house of Austria all bore the title of sire de Salins.

In 1477 Salins was taken by the French and temporarily made the seat of the parliament of Franche-Comté by Louis XI. In 1668 and 1674 it was retaken by the French and thenceforward remained in their power. In 1825 the town was almost destroyed by fire. In 1871, it successfully resisted the German troops in the Franco-Prussian War.

French composer Charles Galibert (1826–1858) was born in Salins-les-Bains.

Until the early 20th century, the slopes surrounding the town were largely covered in vines, which were however almost entirely abandoned after the phylloxera crisis decimated the vineyard. Little trace of this former activity remains today.

For much of the 20th century, the town was also famed for its potters, but today only three craftsmen continue to uphold this local tradition.

Great Saltworks

The extraction of salt at Salins-les-Bains began during the Middle Ages at the latest. As early as 1115, there were two saltworks located at wells around the town, and because of the salt production, Salins-les-Bains was the largest town in Franche-Comté after Besançon in medieval times. Deforestation in the region during the 17th and 18th centuries led to the creation of the Royal Saltworks at Arc-et-Senans, at a more favorable location near a large forest. However, the brine extracted from Salins would still be used, being channeled to the Royal Saltworks, 21 km away, for processing. In 1962, the Great Saltworks of Salins-les-Bains ceased all production.

Demographics

Sights
The town has a Romanesque church, St-Anatoile, which has been well restored, and a hôtel de ville from the 18th century. A 17th-century Jesuit chapel contains a library, established in 1593, and a museum.

Transportation
Salins-les-Bains is on the Paris to Lausanne (Switzerland) road. The closest railway station is in Mouchard, a few kilometres away.

Twin towns
 Horb am Neckar, Germany, since 1991

See also
Communes of the Jura department

References

Communes of Jura (department)